Last Night I Saved Her From Vampires is a live album by the Welsh band Future of the Left. It was recorded in Cardiff Clwb Ifor Bach and London Water Rats in August 2008. The album was initially available at live shows from late 2008 onwards, but was given a general release on CD and Download by 4AD on 2 February 2009.

Track listing 

 "The Best Laid Plans"
 "Wrigley Scott"
 "Plague Of Onces"
 "Fingers Become Thumbs"
 "Drink Nike"
 "Distant Jabs At A Soul"
 "Manchasm"
 "V.D.F.A"
 "Dancing Etiquette"
 "Fuck The Countryside Alliance"
 "Olympic Ideals"
 "Small Bones Small Bodies"
 "The Lord Hates A Coward"
 "London Shoes"
 "My Gymnastic Past"
 "Encores Explained"
 "adeadenemyalwayssmellsgood"
 "Auf Wiedersehen Goodbye"
 "Cloak The Dagger"

References

2009 live albums
Future of the Left albums
4AD live albums